Crassispira verbernei is a species of sea snail, a marine gastropod mollusk in the family Pseudomelatomidae.

Description
The length of the shell attains 4.8 mm.

Distribution
This marine species occurs in the Caribbean Sea off Colombia and the Netherlands Antilles

References

 De Jong K.M. & Coomans H.E. (1988) Marine gastropods from Curaçao, Aruba and Bonaire. Leiden: E.J. Brill. 261 pp.
 Fallon P.J. (2011) Descriptions and illustrations of some new and poorly known turrids (Turridae) of the tropical northwestern Atlantic. Part 2. Genus Crassispira Swainson, 1840, subgenera Monilispira Bartsch & Rehder, 1939 and Dallspira Bartsch, 1950. The Nautilus 125(1): 15-28

External links
 
 

verbernei
Gastropods described in 1988